Sun Red Sun was an American heavy metal project created by guitarist Al B. Romano. It also featured several prominent musicians: vocalists Ray Gillen of Badlands and Black Sabbath, and John West of Artension and Royal Hunt; drummer Bobby Rondinelli of Rainbow; bassists Mike Starr of Alice in Chains and John McCoy of Gillan; and lead guitarist Chris Caffery of Savatage and Trans-Siberian Orchestra.

Personnel 
Vocals: Ray Gillen, John West, Al B. Romano
Guitar: Romano, Chris Caffery
Bass guitar: John McCoy, Mike Starr, Romano
Drums: Mike Sciotto, Bobby Rondinelli

Discography

Sun Red Sun

References

External links 
 

Musical groups established in 1991
Musical groups disestablished in 1994
Heavy metal musical groups from North Carolina